William Henry Hopkin (1 July 1914 – 3 March 2002) was a Welsh rugby union, and professional rugby league footballer who played in the 1930s and 1940s.

Hopkin was born in Newport, he played representative level rugby union (RU) for Wales, and at club level for Chepstow RFC, Gloucester RFC and Newport RFC, as a Wing, i.e. number 11 or 14, played club level rugby league (RL) for Swinton, and played association football (soccer) with Newport County reserves, he died in Newport aged 87.

International honours
Bill Hopkin won a cap for Wales (RU) while at Newport RFC in 1937 against Scotland.

References

External links
Search for "Hopkin" at rugbyleagueproject.org

Statistics at espnscrum.com
Statistics at wru.co.uk
(archived by web.archive.org) Profile at blackandambers.co.uk

1914 births
2002 deaths
Footballers who switched code
Gloucester Rugby players
Newport RFC players
Swinton Lions players
Rugby league players from Newport, Wales
Rugby union players from Newport, Wales
Rugby union wings
Wales international rugby union players
Welsh rugby league players
Welsh rugby union players